Charles Redgie was a French-based film actor who appeared in thirty six productions between 1930 and 1939. He starred in the French-language film Captain Craddock (1931) and its English-language version Monte Carlo Madness (1932). Several of his performances were made in films made by the French subsidiary of the German studio UFA.

Selected filmography
 The Mystery of the Yellow Room (1930)
 My Childish Father (1930)
 Captain Craddock (1931)
 Monte Carlo Madness (1932)
 A Gentleman of the Ring (1932)
 Here's Berlin (1932)
 Happy Ever After (1932)
 The Last Billionaire (1934)
 George and Georgette (1934)
 Samson (1936)
 Wells in Flames (1937)
 The Men Without Names (1937)
 Fort Dolorès (1939)

References

Bibliography
 Goble, Alan. The Complete Index to Literary Sources in Film. Walter de Gruyter, 1999.

External links

Year of birth unknown
Year of death unknown
French male film actors